INDRA NAVY is a joint, biennial military exercise conducted by India and Russia starting in 2003. The exercise is tasked with boosting cooperation and interoperability between the Russian and Indian navies. The word INDRA is a portmanteau of the participants' respective countries. The exercise involves live firing drills, as well as air defence and anti submarine operations. Additionally, counterpiracy, terrorism and drug smuggling operations are carried out.

Background 
The end of the Cold War which brought greatly reduced defense budgets saw a collapse in ship building and naval activity in Russia throughout the 1990s. During this time, the Russian navy had no presence in the Indian Ocean. This changed in 2001, when a contingent of naval ships, including anti-submarine warfare vessels and a tanker docked at Mumbai. In April 2003, nine warships of the Russian navy departed from their bases at Sevastopol in the Black Sea and Vladivostok for the Indian Ocean. These units engaged in a number of exercises with the Indian navy. Russian Defence Minister Sergei Ivanov proposed joint naval exercises to be held later that year.

The 12th edition took place in the Volgograd, Russia in August 2021.

Image gallery

See also 
 Indradhanush

References

External links

Official web site
Bharat Rakshak - Informative web site
Defence - Informative web site
 Domain B online business magazine

Military exercises involving Russia
Indian naval exercises
India–Russia relations